Mabel Leigh Hunt (November 1, 1892 – September 3, 1971) was an American writer of children's books.

Hunt was born in Coatesville, Indiana, to Quaker parents. She was raised in Greencastle and, from age ten until her physician father died, in Plainfield (a center of Indiana Quaker activity). She and her mother then lived in Indianapolis.

Hunt studied at DePauw University in Greencastle from 1910 to 1912 and returned to school in 1923 for a year at Western Reserve University Library School in Cleveland. From 1926 she was a librarian at the Indianapolis Public Library. Her first book was published in 1934 (Lucinda, A Little Girl of 1860) and in 1938 she left her position to write full-time.

She was one of the Newbery Medal runners-up twice, for  Have You Seen Tom Thumb? in 1943 and for Better Known as Johnny Appleseed in 1951. Better Known as Johnny Appleseed was also listed by the New York Herald-Tribune as one of the best Western books ever written.

Lucinda, A Little Girl of 1860 was based on her own and her mother's experiences. Hunt wrote many other works on Quaker themes, including The Double Birthday Present (1947); a 1959 article on Quaker children and Quaker-related children's books for the periodical You Are Called; Cupola House (1961); and Beggar's Daughter (1963). Her papers include a personal letter from Richard Nixon (who had a Quaker background), written in 1960, a year when he was both vice president and the losing candidate for president.

She died September 3, 1971.

Awards
 Newbery Medal runner-up, Have You Seen Tom Thumb?, 1943
 Newbery Medal runner-up, Better Known as Johnny Appleseed, 1951

See also

References

External links
 Mabel Leigh Hunt at Indiana Authors, Ball State University – reprinted from Contemporary Authors Online and St. James Guide to Children's Writers
 Mabel Leigh Hunt at Our Land, Our Literature, Ball State University
 Mabel Leigh Hunt Papers at Children's Literature Research Collections, University of Minnesota – with biographical sketch
 

1892 births
1971 deaths
American children's writers
American Quakers
Newbery Honor winners
People from Hendricks County, Indiana
Writers from Indiana
DePauw University alumni
Place of death missing
American women children's writers
People from Greencastle, Indiana
20th-century American women
20th-century American people